Lymire is a genus of tiger moths in the family Erebidae. The genus was erected by Francis Walker in 1854.

Species
Lymire albipennis (Herrich-Schäffer, 1866)
Lymire albipedalis Gaede, 1926
Lymire candida Forbes, 1917
Lymire edwardsii (Grote, 1881) – Edwards' wasp moth
Lymire fulvicollis Dognin, 1914
Lymire lacina Schaus, 1924
Lymire melanocephala Walker, 1854
Lymire metamelas (Walker, 1854)
Lymire methyalea Dognin, 1916
Lymire nitens (Rothschild, 1912)
Lymire senescens Forbes, 1917
Lymire strigivenia H. Druce, 1898
Lymire vedada Schaus, 1938

References

Euchromiina
Moth genera